Lee Jae-won (born February 24, 1988) is South Korean professional baseball catcher for the SSG Landers of the KBO League.

He represented South Korea at the 2018 Asian Games.

After the 2018 season, he became a free agent and stayed at 6.9 billion won in total for four years.

References

External links
Career statistics and player information from the KBO League

1988 births
Living people
Asian Games gold medalists for South Korea
Asian Games medalists in baseball
Baseball players at the 2014 Asian Games
Baseball players at the 2018 Asian Games
KBO League catchers
Medalists at the 2014 Asian Games
Medalists at the 2018 Asian Games
SSG Landers players
South Korean baseball players
Sportspeople from Incheon